Aodh Ruadh CLG are a GAA club based in the town of Ballyshannon in County Donegal.

Historically one of their county's most successful GAA clubs, they have won 12 Donegal Senior Football Championships, they currently compete in Division 1 of the league and the Senior Championship.

The club colours are green and white and they play their home games at Fr Tierney Park.

History
Aodh Ruadh was founded in 1909 as a football and hurling club.

Fr Tierney Park opened officially in 1954.

Jim "Natch" Gallagher was mentor to Donegal's 1972 and 1974 Ulster Senior Football Championship-winning teams.

With Bundoran, Aodh Ruadh formed one half of the St Joseph's team that won seven County Championships and an Ulster Club Championship—the only Donegal team to achieve this feat until Gaoth Dobhair in 2018. They also contributed three players to Donegal's 1992 All-Ireland SFC title win: Brian Murray, Gary Walsh and Sylvester Maguire.

In 2011, Aodh Ruadh created history by electing an all-female executive consisting of: Betty McIntyre, Chair, Emma Gaughan, Secretary, and Catherine McKee, Treasurer.

Notable players

Football

 Peter Boyle — 2010 Ulster Under-21 FC winner and 2010 All-Ireland Under-21 FC finalist

 Martin Carney — 1972 and 1974 Ulster SFC winner; 1973 Railway Cup winner; 

 John Duffy

 Matt Gallagher — 1982 All-Ireland Under-21 FC winner; 1992 All-Ireland SFC winner; 1992 All-Star

 Alan Kane — 1972 and 1974 Ulster SFC winner 

 Niall McCready — 1995 Ulster Under-21 FC winner

 Pauric McShea — 1966 Ulster Under-21 FC winner; 1972 Ulster SFC winner; 1974 Ulster SFC winning captain; 
 Sylvester Maguire — 1992 Sigerson Cup and All-Ireland SFC winner
 Brian Murray — 1992 All-Ireland SFC winner; 1994 and 1995 Railway Cup winner

 Brian Roper — 1995 Ulster Under-21 FC winner; 2007 National Football League winner

 Gary Walsh — 1991 Railway Cup winner; 1992 All-Ireland SFC winner; 1992 All-Star

Hurling

 Jamie Brennan — 2018 and 2019 Ulster Senior Football Championship winner
 Sylvester Maguire — 1989 Ulster Junior Hurling Championship winner

Managers

Honours
 Donegal Senior Football Championship: 1929, 1932, 1937, 1939, 1942, 1943, 1951, 1986, 1987, 1994, 1997, 1998
 Donegal Division 1 Football League: 1930, 1941, 1944, 1945, 1947, 1955, 1997
 Donegal Division 2 Football League: 2017, 2021
 Donegal Division 3 Football League: 2016
 Donegal Division 4 Football League: 1982, 2007, 2008
 Donegal Intermediate Football Championship: 2020  **Runner-up: 2012, 2018
 Donegal Under-21 Football Championship: 1981, 1982, 1988, 1989, 1993
 Donegal Under-21 B Football Championship: 2013
 Ulster Minor Club Football Championship: 1992
 Donegal Minor Football Championship: 1935, 1936, 1937, 1961, 1963, 1979, 1980, 1981, 1982, 1988, 1990, 1992
 Donegal Minor Football League: 1980, 1982, 1986, 2012

See also
 Hugh Roe O'Donnell

References

External links
 Official website

1909 establishments in Ireland
Gaelic games clubs in County Donegal
Gaelic football clubs in County Donegal
Hurling clubs in County Donegal
Sport in Ballyshannon